Christopher Moffat (born September 22, 1979) is a Canadian luger who has competed since 2000. Competing in three Winter Olympics, he earned his best finish of fifth in the men's doubles event at Salt Lake City in 2002.

Moffat's  best finish at the FIL World Luge Championships was tenth in the men's doubles event at Oberhof, Germany in 2008.

He resides in his hometown of Calgary, Alberta in the offseason.

Moffat had a screw removed from his wrist following a fracture to stabilize it.

References

External links 
 
 
 
 

1979 births
Living people
Canadian male lugers
Olympic lugers of Canada
Lugers at the 2002 Winter Olympics
Lugers at the 2006 Winter Olympics
Lugers at the 2010 Winter Olympics
Sportspeople from Alberta